Ulan-Ivolginsky (Ulaan Ivalgyn) is a rural locality (an ulus) in Ivolginsky District, Republic of Buryatia, Russia. The population was 90 as of 2010. There are 2 streets.

Geography 
Ulan-Ivolginsky is located 9 km northeast of Ivolginsk (the district's administrative centre) by road. Nizhnyaya Ivolga is the nearest rural locality.

References 

Rural localities in Ivolginsky District